The 2017 New England Revolution season was the club's 22nd season of existence, and their 22nd season in Major League Soccer, the top-flight of American soccer.

Current squad
As of September 14, 2017. Source: New England Revolution Roster

Technical staff

Matches and results

Preseason

MLS regular season

Eastern Conference table

Overall standings

Matches

U.S. Open Cup

Transfers

In 
Per Major League Soccer and club policies terms of the deals do not get disclosed.

|-

|-

|-

|-

|-

|-

|-

|-
|}

Draft picks

Out 

|-

|-

Player statistics

Top scorers

As of September 16, 2017.

Awards
 Team Most Valuable Player: Antonio Delamea 
 Team Golden Boot: Kei Kamara (12 G, 5 A)
 Team Defender of the Year: Antonio Delamea
 Team Humanitarian of the Year: Kelyn Rowe (4-time winner)
 Players' Player of the Year: Teal Bunbury
 UnitedHealthcare Youth Player of the Year: Joe Brito
 MLS Player of the Week: Juan Agudelo (Week 4), Kei Kamara (Week 26)

References

New England Revolution seasons
New England Revolution
New England Revolution
New England Revolution
Sports competitions in Foxborough, Massachusetts